The men's sprint at the 1960 Summer Olympics in Rome, Italy was held on 26 to 29 August 1960. There were 30 participants from 18 nations. For the first time since 1924, nations were allowed to have more than one competitor each (the limit was raised to two); for the first time since 1924, one nation took multiple medals. Italians Sante Gaiardoni and Valentino Gasparella won gold and bronze, giving Italy a four-Games podium streak with three total gold medals—second all-time behind France's five. Leo Sterckx's silver was Belgium's first medal in the men's sprint.

Background

This was the 12th appearance of the event, which has been held at every Summer Olympics except 1904 and 1912. None of the quarterfinalists from 1956 returned. The Italian team was favored, with Valentino Gasparella (the 1958 and 1959 world champion) and Sante Gaiardoni (the 1960 world champion, and runner-up to Gasparella in both previous years).

The British West Indies made its debut in the men's sprint; East and West Germany competed as the United Team of Germany. France made its 12th appearance, the only nation to have competed at every appearance of the event.

Competition format

Sprint cycling involves a series of head-to-head matches. The 1960 competition involved nine rounds: heats, a two-round repechage, 1/8 finals, another two-round repechage, quarterfinals, semifinals, and finals.

 Heats: The 37 entrants were divided into 12 heats, most of 3 cyclists but one of 4 cyclists. After 7 withdrawals, no heat had more than 3 cyclists; many had 2 and one heat had only 1 competitor. The winner of each heat advanced directly to the 1/8 finals (12 cyclists), while all other cyclists who competed were sent to the first repechage (18 cyclists).
 Repechage 1: This was a two-round repechage. The first round consisted of 9 heats of 2 cyclists. The winners advanced to the second round of the repechage, while the losers were eliminated. The second round had 3 heats of 3 cyclists each; the top 2 in each heat joined the main competition again at the 1/8 finals (6 cyclists) while the 3rd-place rider in each heat was eliminated.
 1/8 finals: The 18 cyclists who advanced through the heats or the first repechage competed in a 1/8 finals round. There were 6 heats in this round, with 3 cyclists in each. The top cyclist in each heat advanced to the quarterfinals (6 cyclists), while the other 2 in each heat went to the second repechage (12 cyclists).
 Repechage 2: This was another two-round repechage, but with a different format. This repechage began with 4 heats of 3 cyclists each. The top cyclist in each heat advanced to the second round, while the other 2 cyclists in each heat were eliminated. The second round of this repechage featured 2 heats of 2 cyclists each, with the winners advancing to the quarterfinals and the losers eliminated.
 Quarterfinals: Beginning with the quarterfinals, all matches were one-on-one competitions and were held in best-of-three format. There were 4 quarterfinals, with the winner of each advancing to the semifinals and the loser eliminated.
 Semifinals: The two semifinals provided for advancement to the gold medal final for winners and to the bronze medal final for losers.
 Finals: Both a gold medal final and a bronze medal final were held.

Records

The records for the sprint are 200 metre flying time trial records, kept for the qualifying round in later Games as well as for the finish of races.

Leo Sterckx matched the Olympic record of 11.4 seconds in the last 200 metres of the third heat in round 1. Anésio Argenton tied it as well, in heat 4 of the 1/8 finals. Sterckx broke it with 11.3 seconds in the next heat. Sante Gaiardoni matched Sterckx's new record in the second race of the fourth quarterfinal. Valentino Gasparella dropped the record a further two-tenths of a second, to 11.1 seconds, in the first race of the first semifinal. Gaiardoni matched him in the first race of the final.

Schedule

All times are Central European Time (UTC+1)

Results

Round 1

Heat 1

Heat 2

Heat 3

Heat 4

Heat 5

Heat 6

Heat 7

Heat 8

Heat 9

Heat 10

Heat 11

Heat 12

First repechage heats

First repechage heat 1

First repechage heat 2

First repechage heat 3

First repechage heat 4

First repechage heat 5

First repechage heat 6

First repechage heat 7

First repechage heat 8

First repechage heat 9

First repechage finals

First repechage final 1

First repechage final 2

First repechage final 3

1/8 finals

1/8 final heat 1

1/8 final heat 2

1/8 final heat 3

1/8 final heat 4

Gasparella "was retroceded from 1st to 3rd place."

1/8 final heat 5

1/8 final heat 6

Second repechage heats

Second repechage heat 1

Second repechage heat 2

Second repechage heat 3

Second repechage heat 4

Second repechage finals

Second repechage final 1

Second repechage final 2

Quarterfinals

Quarterfinal 1

Quarterfinal 2

Quarterfinal 3

Quarterfinal 4

Semifinals

Semifinal 1

Semifinal 2

Finals

Bronze medal final

Gold medal final

Final classification

References

Cycling at the 1960 Summer Olympics
Cycling at the Summer Olympics – Men's sprint
Track cycling at the 1960 Summer Olympics